Max Angst (July 3, 1921 – January 21, 2002) was a Swiss bobsledder who competed in the late 1950s. He won the bronze medal in the two-man event at the 1956 Winter Olympics in Cortina d'Ampezzo.

Angst also won a bronze medal in the four-man event at the 1960 FIBT World Championships in Cortina d'Ampezzo.

References
Bobsleigh two-man Olympic medalists 1932-56 and since 1964
Bobsleigh four-man world championship medalists since 1930
DatabaseOlympics.com profile

1921 births
2002 deaths
Bobsledders at the 1956 Winter Olympics
Swiss male bobsledders
Olympic medalists in bobsleigh
Medalists at the 1956 Winter Olympics
Olympic bronze medalists for Switzerland
Olympic bobsledders of Switzerland
20th-century Swiss people